Bishop Varghese Chakkalakal is the current bishop of the Roman Catholic Diocese of Calicut.

Early life 
Varghese was born on 7 February 1953 at Malapallipuram, Kerala, India.

Education 
He acquired his Master of Theology from Pontifical Seminary, Aluva, Kerala, India and also completed his Master of Arts specialising in History from University of Mysore. He acquired his doctorate in canon law from Pontifical Urban University, Rome. He was a professor of Fundamental Theology, Canon Law and Moral Theology.

Priesthood 
He joined St. Joseph's Seminary, Mangalore in 1971 for the diocese of Calicut. He was ordained a priest by Bishop Maxwell Noronha on 2 April 1981 in Mother of God Cathedral, Calicut. He also served as Dean of Studies.

Episcopate 
On 5 November 1998 he was appointed as the bishop of the Roman Catholic Diocese of Kannur and was consecrated as the first Bishop of Kannur *On 7 February 1999 by Archbishop Daniel Acharuparambil, O.C.D. His episcopal motto is " According to Your Will".
On 15 May 2012 he was appointed bishop of the Roman Catholic Diocese of Calicut.

References 

21st-century Roman Catholic bishops in India
1953 births
Living people
Pontifical Urban University alumni